Dindica subvirens is a moth of the family Geometridae first described by Katsumi Yazaki and Min Wang in 2004. It is found in Guangdong, China.

References

Moths described in 2004
Pseudoterpnini